John Jenkins may refer to:

Politicians
John Jenkins (governor) (died 1681), colonial governor of North Carolina
John Theophilus Jenkins (1829–1919), physician and political figure in Prince Edward Island, Canada
John Jones Jenkins, 1st Baron Glantawe (1835–1915), Welsh MP for Carmarthen
Edward Jenkins (MP) (John Edward Jenkins, 1838–1910), British barrister, author and Liberal Party politician
John J. Jenkins (1843–1911), Wisconsin congressman and Puerto Rico judge
John Jenkins (Australian politician) (1851–1923), American-born Premier of South Australia
John Jenkins (British politician) (1852–1936), British politician, MP for Chatham, 1906–1910
John George Jenkins (1919–2007), Scottish farmers leader, TV presenter and politician
John Barnard Jenkins (1933–2020), Welsh nationalist, effective leader of Mudiad Amddiffyn Cymru in the 1960s
John Jenkins (American politician) (1952-2020), Maine state senator, mayor and candidate for governor of Maine
Sir John Jenkins (diplomat) (born 1955), British ambassador to Saudi Arabia
John Jenkins (Welsh politician) (born 1981), local politician in Wales

Musicians, artists and entertainers
John Jenkins (composer) (1592–1678), English composer
Johnny Jenkins (1939–2006), guitarist
John Jenkins (poet) (born 1949), Australian poet
John Jenkins (jazz musician) (1931–1993), American saxophonist
John Pickens Jenkins, better known as Bobo Jenkins (1916–1984), American blues singer and record label owner
John A. Jenkins (born 1950), American journalist and author

Sportspeople
John Jenkins (American football coach) (born 1952), American football coach
John Jenkins (defensive tackle) (born 1989), American football player
John Jenkins (Australian footballer) (1936–1980), Australian footballer for Richmond and North Melbourne
John Jenkins (baseball) (1896–1968), Chicago White Sox baseball player
John Jenkins (basketball) (born 1991), American basketball player
John Jenkins (figure skater) (born 1970), British figure skater
Johnny Jenkins (racing driver) (1875–1945), American racing driver
John Jenkins (rugby) (1880–1971), Welsh rugby union and rugby league footballer

Other people
John Jenkins (penmanship) (1755–1822), American schoolteacher who devised a popular style of penmanship
John Jenkins (Ifor Ceri) (1770–1829), Welsh Church of England priest and antiquarian
John Carmichael Jenkins (1809–1855), American plantation owner in the Antebellum South
John David Jenkins (1828–1876), Welsh Tractarian clergyman and railwaymen's union President
John Lewis Jenkins (1857–1912), British administrator in the Imperial Civil Service
John Jenkins (Gwili) (1872–1936), Welsh poet, theologian and Archdruid, 1932–1936
John I. Jenkins (born 1953), president of the University of Notre Dame, 2005–present
John Jenkins, former director of the University of Massachusetts Minuteman Marching Band
John Holmes Jenkins (1940–1989), American historian, antiquarian bookseller, publisher, and poker player
John Brady Jenkins, American drug dealer in The Yogurt Connection drug smuggling ring
John Major Jenkins (1964–2017), American author and populariser of the Maya calendar

See also
Jack Jenkins (disambiguation)
Jackie Jenkins (disambiguation)
Jon Jenkins (born 1958), Australian politician